Amarwara is a tehsil and a Nagar Palika Parishad in Chhindwara district in the state of Madhya Pradesh, India.

Geography and Climate

Geography
It has an average elevation of 796 metres (2,611 feet).
Amarwara is located in between the Mountains of Satpura confined between Dulha Dev Ghati and Bhumka Ghati.

Climate
The climate is warm and temperate in Amarwara. In winter, there is much more rainfall in Amarwara than in summer. According to Köppen and Geiger, this climate is classified as Csa. The average annual temperature is 23.5 °C in Amarwara. About 1088 mm of precipitation falls annually.

Demographics
As of the 2011 Census of India, Amarwara had a population of 14,141. Males constitute 50.3% of the population and females 49.7%. Amarwara has an average literacy rate of 85.58%, higher than the state average of 69.32% and national average of 74.04%; with 90.6% of the males and 80.49% of females literate. 11.43% of the population is under 6 years of age.

Transportation
National Highway 547 connects the town with Chhindwara, Harrai and Narsinghpur.

See also
Amarwara (Vidhan Sabha constituency)

References

Cities and towns in Chhindwara district